Enguerrand V, Lord of Coucy (-after 1321) inherited the title of Lord of Coucy and castle from his maternal uncle, Enguerrand IV in 1311.  He was also lord of Oisy and Montmirail.

Biography
Enguerrand was the second son of Arnould III, Count of Guînes and Alix de Coucy, daughter of Enguerrand III, Lord of Coucy. His father, Arnould, sold the county of Guines to King Louis IX of France, forcing Enguerrand to find his fortune abroad. After arriving in Scotland, he married Christiana Lindsay in Scotland. Christiana was the daughter of William Lindsay and Ada Balliol, sister of John Balliol. Their wedding was arranged by their mutual cousin, King Alexander III of Scotland. Enguerrand was present at the recognition of Margaret as Alexander III's heir and the Treaty of Birgham in 1290.

On 28 May 1283, Enguerrand pledged his service to King Edward I of England.

When Enguerrand's maternal uncle, Enguerrand IV, died without leaving any heirs, the titles and lands of Coucy were passed to Enguerrand.

Issue
Enguerrand and Christiana had four sons:
Guillaume de Coucy, Lord of Coucy,  Marle, La Fère, Oisy and Montmirel, married Isabeau de Châtillon-Saint-Pol, had issue.
Enguerrand de Coucy, Viscount of Meaux, Lord of La Ferté-Ancoul, Tresmes and Belonnes, married firstly Marie de Vianden, Dame de Rumpt and secondly Allemande Flotte de Revel, had issue.
Baudouin de Coucy
Robert de Coucy, Lord of La Ferté-Gaucher.

References

Sources

Lords of Coucy